Zomba may refer to:

Places

Hungary
Zomba, Hungary, village

Malawi
Zomba, Malawi, city
Zomba District
Zomba Massif, mountain
Roman Catholic Diocese of Zomba
Zomba (meteorite), see Meteorite fall

Other
1468 Zomba, an asteroid
Zomba Group of Companies, a UK and American music group founded in 1975
List of Zomba Group companies
Chaerocina zomba, a species of moth